17&Central is a shopping centre in Walthamstow, London, owned by Capital & Regional. It was formerly known as Selborne Walk Shopping Centre (1988-2011) and The Mall Walthamstow (2011-2021).

History
The centre was opened as Selborne Walk in 1988. It was acquired by Capital & Regional in 1997, and rebranded as part of The Mall Fund in 2011–2012.

On the morning of 22 July 2019, a large fire broke out at the centre, considered a "major incident" by the police and tackled by firefighters for up to seven hours. The fire caused extensive damage and destroyed more than half of the building's roof. The damage caused the centre to be closed for several weeks, reopening on 4 September.

In October 2021 the centre was rebranded as "17&Central" - the name a reference to the E17 postcode area - with new exterior signage.

Stores
Stores at The Mall Walthamstow include Clarks, Asda, Boots, TK Maxx across one floor, along with restaurants on the first floor such as Subway and formerly KFC and Burger King before the fire incident.

References

Shopping centres in the London Borough of Waltham Forest
Shopping malls established in 1988